This is a list of members of the Western Australian Legislative Assembly from 1977 to 1980:

Notes
 At the 1977 election, Liberal member and candidate Alan Ridge won the seat of Kimberley by 93 votes against the Labor candidate Ernie Bridge. Both sides alleged irregularities, and upon a petition against Ridge's election, a fresh election was ordered for 17 December 1977, which was won by Ridge.
 In August 1978, a new party, the National Party, was formed to accommodate National Country MPs who had split from their party over the coalition question. The National Country Party (NCP) remained in coalition with the Liberal Party, whilst the National Party (NP) occupied the cross-benches.

Members of Western Australian parliaments by term